Gaotou railway station is a fourth-class railway station in Gaotou Village, Jianhua District, Qiqihar, Heilongjiang located on the Qiqihar–Bei'an railway. It was put into operation in January 1931.

References

Railway stations in Heilongjiang
Stations on the Qiqihar–Bei'an railway